Sour Soul is a collaborative studio album from Canadian jazz instrumental hip hop band BadBadNotGood and Wu-Tang Clan member Ghostface Killah. It was released worldwide on February 24, 2015.

Production 
Sour Soul is the collaborative album from for which BBNG and Ghostface Killah sought inspiration from the music of the 1960s and 70s. This included the recording techniques and production of that era, eschewing sampling in favor of live instrumentation. All tracks are produced by Frank Dukes, with additional production from BadBadNotGood and Wayne Gordon. MF DOOM, Elzhi, Danny Brown and Tree contributed feature guest spots. Ghostface does not appear on tracks 1, 5 and 12, which are instrumental tracks.

A majority of tracks were recorded in Thomas Brenneck's Dunham Sound Studios in Williamsburg, Brooklyn with contributors from New York soul revival scene including sessions musicians from The Budos Band and Daptone Records engineer Wayne Gordon. Other recording sessions took place in Frank Dukes' Kingsway Studios with contributions from Toronto artists River Tiber and David Lewis.

Sour Soul (Instrumentals) 
As a companion record, Lex Records simultaneously released an instrumental version of the album.

Critical reception

Sour Soul has received generally favorable reviews from music critics. At Metacritic, which assigns a weighted average score out of 100 to reviews from mainstream critics, the album received an average score of 76, based on 27 reviews. In a mixed review for Exclaim!, Eric Zaworski noted that the record "hurriedly finishes without giving its concepts enough time to bloom," further explaining that "the production is top-notch, but Ghost rarely shifts into uncharted lyrical territory, holding back Sour Soul's otherwise consistent production."

In an extremely positive review, giving the album a score of 9 out of 10, Sam Moore wrote for Drowned in Sound that "Sour Soul is sublime." Adding that "rather than standing around starstruck, BBNG have more than proven their worth as Ghostface’s backing band."

The album was a short-listed nominee for the 2015 Polaris Music Prize.

Track listing

Personnel
Credits adapted from the album's liner notes.

BADBADNOTGOOD and Ghostface Killah
Matthew Tavares – guitar, keyboards, synthesizers; producer, engineer, mixing
Chester Hansen – bass guitar, keyboards; producer
Alexander Sowinski – drums, percussion, synthesizer, vibraphone; producer
Ghostface Killah – rapping
Additional contributors 
Frank Dukes – producer, engineer, mixing, vibraphone
Leland Whitty – saxophone, viola
Tommy Paxton-Beesley – cello, violin, trombone, guitar, organ
David Lewis – tuba
Thomas Brenneck – guitar (track 4)
Wayne Gordon – guitar (track 3), production, engineer
Jared Tankel – baritone saxophone
Billy Aukstik – trumpet
Nadav Same Nirenberg – trombone
Freddy DeBoe – tenor saxophone
Stephen Koszler – mixing
Noel Summervile – mastering

Charts

References

External links
 BadBadNotGood website
 BadBadNotGood on Tumblr
 BadBadNotGood on Bandcamp
 Lex Records website

2015 albums
BadBadNotGood albums
Ghostface Killah albums
Collaborative albums
Albums produced by Frank Dukes